Anise of Flavigny is a candy from Flavigny-sur-Ozerain in Burgundy.

Anise candies were first made by the Benedictine monks of the abbey of Flavigny (founded in 719), as reported by the Roman traveller Flavius.

After the French revolution, several confectioners began making this delicacy using the same recipe. Only one manufacturer remains today at the abbey, Maison Troubat, who claims to follow a recipe which has been in use since 1591.

Each candy is made in a dragee process starting with a single anise seed: Over a period of 15 days it is covered with successive coats of flavored sugar syrup. The finished candy is always called "Anis" by its makers, even when the flavor is one of violet, rose, mint, jasmine, liquorice, or orange instead of anise.

External links
 Official website of the Maison Troubat, the sole surviving manufacturer of Anis de Flavigny.

History of Burgundy
French confectionery
Anise